State Highway 13 (West Bengal) is a state highway in West Bengal, India.

Route
As per Government of India’s Gazette notification in 2010, NH 114 runs from its junction with NH 14 near Mallarpur in Birbhum to its junction with NH 19 near Bardhaman. As per the Public Works Department of the Government of West Bengal, SH 13 runs from Palsit to Dankuni. As per West Bengal Traffic Police, SH 13 runs from Mallarpur to Dankuni. Here we are considering the route for SH 13 from Palsit to Dankuni. For those who are interested in the route from Mallarpur to Palsit may see NH 114.

SH 13 originates from junction with NH 114  and NH 19 at Palsit (in Bardhaman district)  and passes through Rasulpur, Memari,  Boinchi, Pandua, Mogra, Saptagram, Sugandha and Baidyabati,  and terminates at the junction with NH 19, NH 16, Belghoria Expressway and SH 15 at Dankuni (in Hooghly district).

The total length of SH 13 is 82.61 km.

Districts traversed by SH 13 are:
Bardhaman district (0 – 16.34 km)Hooghly district (16.34 – 82.61 km)

Road section 
It is divided into three road section:

See also
List of state highways in West Bengal

References

State Highways in West Bengal